Aniekeme Alphonsus (born December 25, 1999) is a Nigerian athlete who competes in sprint and middle distance races. She won a gold and silver medal in the 4 x 100 meter relay and 100m race, at the 2015 African Junior Athletics Championships.

Sports career
She participated in 100m and 200m race in the 2014 Nigerian Youth Championships (U18) held in Ijebu Ode (Nigeria). She claimed the gold medal after coming in 1st, with Favor Ekezie and Abolaji Omotayo Oluwaseun ending up with the silver and bronze medals respectively.
Aniekeme participated in the 2015 African Junior Athletics Championships. At the 100m race, she came in second after Tamzin Thomas with a time of 11.83s and won the silver medal. She also participated in the 4×100 metres relay. Nigeria ended up with a time record of 44.83, a new championship record and won the gold medal.

At the 2015 African Youth Athletics Championships, she participated in the Medley relay and the Nigerian team won the gold medal with a performance record of 2:08.71. She also participated in the Long jump event. She claimed the silver medal with a performance result of 5.50m.
Aniekeme participated in the 2015 Commonwealth Youth Games 100m, 200m, 4×100 metres relay, 4×200 metres relay and 4×400 metres relay. She came in at 11.64 earning herself a silver medal in the 100m race. With a record of 23.63 at the 200m, she came in 3rd and won the bronze medal. The Nigerian team recorded a time of 45.86 and came in first place owning the gold medal at the 4x100 metres relay. The Nigerian team also won the gold medals at the 4x200m and 4x400m relay.

2016 & 2017

At the 2016 IAAF World U20 Championships - Women's 200 metres and 100m, Aniekeme participated but did not reach the semifinals. The team appeared in the 4x100m in the 2017 World Championships but did not advance to the finals.

At the All-Nigeria Track and Field Championships held at the Abuja, she claims 1st Senior 100m National title with a time record of 11.52s.

See also 
List of African youth bests in athletics

References

 Complete Results Girls. COCAD 15. Retrieved on 2020-11-10.

External links 
Aniekeme Alphonsus - Guardian newspaper
Aniekeme break records in America by Punch newspaper
Aniekeme Alphonsus - Akwa ibom.

1999 births
Living people
Nigerian female sprinters
People from Maiduguri
21st-century Nigerian women